Tennessee Plates is the fifth studio album by American country music singer-songwriter Mark Collie. It was 
his only album for Giant Records. It featured 3 singles. "Three Words, Two Hearts, One Night" charted at number 25, while "Steady as She Goes" reached at peak of 65. The last single "Lipstick Don't Lie" failed to chart. "Spirit of a Boy, Wisdom of a Man" was later released as a single by Randy Travis from his 1998 album You and You Alone.

Track listing

Production
Produced By James Stroud & Mark Collie
Recorded By John Guess; assisted by Derek Bason
Additional Recording By Kevin Beamish & Julian King; assisted by Mark Hagen, Ricky Cobble & Peter Martinez
Mixed By John Guess; assisted by Derek Bason
Mastered By John Guess & Marty Williams
Production Co-Ordination: Abbe Nameche & Doug Rich

Personnel
Larry Byrom – acoustic guitar
Mark Collie – lead vocals, acoustic guitar
Stuart Duncan – fiddle
Paul Franklin – steel guitar
John Hobbs – piano
Dann Huff – electric guitar
Paul Leim – drums
Steve Nathan – Hammond B-3 organ
Matt Rollings – piano
Leland Sklar – bass guitar
James Stroud – drums
Tony Joe White – electric guitar on "Tunica Motel"

References

Mark Collie; "Tennessee Plates" CD Booklet. 1995 Giant Records.

1995 albums
Mark Collie albums
Albums produced by James Stroud
Giant Records (Warner) albums
Songs about crime